Laminacauda defoei is a species of sheet weaver found in the Juan Fernandez Islands. It was described by O.P.-Cambridge in 1899.

References

Linyphiidae
Spiders of South America
Spiders described in 1899